Rosalind Allen (born  September 23, 1957) is a New Zealand-born actress, best known for her portrayal of Doctor Wendy Smith in the second season of seaQuest DSV.

Early life
Born Rosalind Ingledew in New Zealand, she studied acting there, before moving to the United States.

Career
Her first movie appearance was as an extra in the film Three Men and a Little Lady, and after guest appearances on a number of daytime dramas dating back to the mid-1980s, and a fairly large part in Children of the Corn II: The Final Sacrifice, as well as several independent films, Allen was signed as a main character in NBC's popular sci-fi series, seaQuest DSV, but she left after one season.

Like her seaQuest predecessor (Stephanie Beacham), she appeared in an episode of Star Trek: The Next Generation. Allen also appeared alongside her then husband Todd Allen in seaQuest DSV in the episode "The Siamese Dream".

Allen twice portrayed the love interest of Bobby Ewing (Patrick Duffy), though different characters, on both the final episode of the original run of Dallas and the first reunion TV movie Dallas: J.R. Returns.

Filmography

External links

Rosalind Allen at UK Terrestrial Cult TV

1957 births
New Zealand film actresses
New Zealand television actresses
Living people